The Oedipus complex (also spelled Œdipus complex) is an idea in psychoanalytic theory. The complex is an ostensibly universal phase in the life of a young boy in which, to try to immediately satisfy basic desires, he unconsciously wishes to have sex with his mother and disdains his father for having sex and being satisfied before him. Sigmund Freud introduced the idea in The Interpretation of Dreams (1899), and coined the term in his paper A Special Type of Choice of Object made by Men (1910).

Freud later developed the ideas of castration anxiety and penis envy to refer to the differences of the sexes in their experience of the complex, especially as their observations appear to become cautionary; an incest taboo results from these cautions. Subsequently, according to sexual difference, a positive Oedipus complex refers to a child's sexual desire for the opposite-sex parent and hatred for the same-sex parent, while a negative Oedipus complex refers to the desire for the same-sex parent and hatred for the opposite-sex parent. Freud considered that the child's identification with the same-sex parent is the socially acceptable outcome of the complex. Meanwhile, failure to move on from the compulsion to satisfy a basic desire and to reconcile with the same-sex parent leads to neurosis.

The existence of the Oedipus complex is not well supported by empirical evidence. Critics have charged that, by attributing sexual desire to children, the theory has served as a cover-up for sexual abuse of children. Scholars and psychologists have criticized it as incapable of applying to same-sex parents, and as incompatible with the widespread aversion to incest.

It is named for the mythological figure Oedipus, whose depiction in Sophocles' Oedipus Rex served as a reference point for Freud's idea. Freud rejected the term Electra complex, introduced by Carl Jung in 1913 as a proposed equivalent complex among young girls.

Background

Oedipus refers to a 5th-century BC Greek mythological character Oedipus, who unwittingly kills his father, Laius, and marries his mother, Jocasta. A play based on the myth, Oedipus Rex, was written by Sophocles, ca. 429 BC.

Modern productions of Sophocles' play were staged in Paris and Vienna in the 19th century and were phenomenally successful in the 1880s and 1890s. The Austrian neurologist Sigmund Freud (1856–1939) attended. In his book The Interpretation of Dreams, first published in 1899, he proposes that an Oedipal desire is a universal, psychological phenomenon innate (phylogenetic) to human beings, and the cause of much unconscious guilt.

Freud believed that the Oedipal sentiment has been inherited through the millions of years it took for humans to evolve from apes. He based this on his analysis of his feelings attending the play, his anecdotal observations of neurotic or normal children, and on the fact that Oedipus Rex was effective on both ancient and modern audiences. Freud describes the Oedipus myth's timeless appeal thus:
His destiny moves us only because it might have been ours — because the Oracle laid the same curse upon us before our birth as upon him. It is the fate of all of us, perhaps, to direct our first sexual impulse towards our mother and our first hatred and our first murderous wish against our father. Our dreams convince us that this is so.

Freud also claims that the play Hamlet "has its roots in the same soil as Oedipus Rex", and that the differences between the two plays are revealing: In [Oedipus Rex] the child's wishful fantasy that underlies it is brought into the open and realized as it would be in a dream. In Hamlet it remains repressed; and—just as in the case of a neurosis—we only learn of its existence from its inhibiting consequences.Oedipus as Evidence: The Theatrical Background to Freud's Oedipus Complex  by Richard Armstrong, 1999

However, in The Interpretation of Dreams, Freud makes it clear that the "primordial urges and fears" that are his concern and the basis of the Oedipal complex are inherent in the myths the play by Sophocles is based on, not primarily in the play itself, which Freud refers to as a "further modification of the legend" that originates in a "misconceived secondary revision of the material, which has sought to exploit it for theological purposes".

Before the idea of the Oedipus complex, Freud believed that childhood sexual trauma was the cause of neurosis. This idea, sometimes called Freud's seduction theory, was deemphasized in favor of the Oedipus complex around 1897.

Timeline
 1896. Freud publishes The Aetiology of Hysteria. The paper was criticized for theorizing that hysteria is caused by sexual abuse.
 1897–1909. After his father's death in 1896, and having seen the play Oedipus Rex, by Sophocles, Freud begins using the term "Oedipus". As Freud wrote in an 1897 letter, "I found in myself a constant love for my mother, and jealousy of my father. I now consider this to be a universal event in early childhood."
 1909–1914. Proposes that Oedipal desire is the "nuclear complex" of all neuroses; first usage of "Oedipus complex" in 1910.
 1914–1918. Considers paternal and maternal incest.
 1919–1926. Complete Oedipus complex; identification and bisexuality are conceptually evident in later works.
 1926–1931. Applies the Oedipal theory to religion and custom.
 1931–1938. Investigates the "feminine Oedipus attitude" and "negative Oedipus complex"; later the "Electra complex".

The Oedipus complex

Original formulation

Freud's original examples of the Oedipus complex are applied only to boys or men; he never fully clarified his views on the nature of the complex in girls. He described the complex as a young boy's hatred or desire to eliminate his father and to have sex with his mother.

Freud introduced the term "Oedipus complex" in a 1910 article titled A Special Type of Choice of Object made by Men. It appears in a section of this paper describing what happens after a boy first becomes aware of prostitution:

Freud and others eventually extended this idea and embedded it in a larger body of theory.

Later theory 

In classical psychoanalytic theory, the Oedipus complex occurs during the phallic stage of psychosexual development (age 3–6 years), when also occurs the formation of the libido and the ego; yet it might manifest itself at an earlier age.

In the phallic stage, a boy's decisive psychosexual experience is the Oedipus complex—his son–father competition for possession of mother. It is in this third stage of psychosexual development that the child's genitalia is his or her primary erogenous zone; thus, when children become aware of their bodies, the bodies of other children, and the bodies of their parents, they gratify physical curiosity by undressing and exploring themselves, each other, and their genitals, so learning the anatomic differences between male and female and the gender differences between boy and girl.

Despite mother being the parent who primarily gratifies the child's desires, the child begins forming a discrete sexual identity—"boy", "girl"—that alters the dynamics of the parent and child relationship; the parents become objects of infantile libidinal energy. The boy directs his libido (sexual desire) upon his mother and directs jealousy and emotional rivalry against his father—because it is he who sleeps with his mother. Moreover, to facilitate union with mother, the boy's id wants to kill father (as did Oedipus), but the pragmatic ego, based upon the reality principle, knows that the father is the stronger of the two males competing to possess the one female. Nonetheless, the boy remains ambivalent about his father's place in the family, which is manifested as fear of castration by the physically greater father; the fear is an irrational, subconscious manifestation of the infantile id.

In both sexes, defense mechanisms provide transitory resolutions of the conflict between the drives of the id and the drives of the ego. The first defense mechanism is repression, the blocking of memories, emotional impulses, and ideas from the conscious mind; yet its action does not resolve the id–ego conflict. The second defense mechanism is identification, in which the boy or girl child adapts by incorporating, to his or her (super)ego, the personality characteristics of the same-sex parent. As a result of this, the boy diminishes his castration anxiety, because his likeness to father protects him from father's wrath in their maternal rivalry. In the case of the girl, this facilitates identifying with mother, who understands that, in being females, neither of them possesses a penis, and thus are not antagonists.

Unresolved son–father competition for the psychosexual possession of the mother might result in a phallic stage fixation that leads to the boy becoming an aggressive, over-ambitious, and vain man. Therefore, the satisfactory parental handling and resolution of the Oedipus complex are most important in developing the male infantile super-ego. This is because, by identifying with a parent, the boy internalizes Morality; thereby, he chooses to comply with societal rules, rather than reflexively complying in fear of punishment.

Oedipal case study

In Analysis of a Phobia in a Five-year-old Boy (1909), the case study of the equinophobic boy "Little Hans", Freud showed that the relation between Hans's fears—of horses and of his father—derived from external factors, the birth of a sister, and internal factors, the desire of the infantile id to replace father as companion to mother, and guilt for enjoying the masturbation normal to a boy of his age. Moreover, his admitting to wanting to procreate with mother was considered proof of the boy's sexual attraction to the opposite-sex parent; he was a heterosexual male. Yet, the boy Hans was unable to relate fearing horses to fearing his father. As the treating psychoanalyst, Freud noted that "Hans had to be told many things that he could not say himself" and that "he had to be presented with thoughts, which he had, so far, shown no signs of possessing".

Feminine Oedipus attitude
Freud applied the Oedipus complex to the psychosexual development of boys and girls, but later modified the female aspects of the theory as "feminine Oedipus attitude" and "negative Oedipus complex". His student–collaborator Carl Jung, who, in his 1913 work, "Theory of Psychoanalysis", proposed the Electra complex to describe a girl's daughter–mother competition for psychosexual possession of the father.

In the phallic stage, a girl's Electra complex is her decisive psychodynamic experience in forming a discrete sexual identity (ego). Whereas a boy develops castration anxiety, a girl develops penis envy, for she perceives that she has been castrated previously (and missing the penis), and so forms resentment towards her own kind as inferior, while simultaneously striving to claim her father's penis through bearing a male child of her own. Furthermore, after the phallic stage, the girl's psychosexual development includes transferring her primary erogenous zone from the infantile clitoris to the adult vagina.

Freud thus considered a girl's negative Oedipus complex to be more emotionally intense than that of a boy, resulting, potentially, in a woman of submissive, insecure personality; thus might an unresolved Electra complex, daughter–mother competition for psychosexual possession of father, lead to a phallic-stage fixation conducive to a girl becoming a woman who continually strives to dominate men (viz. penis envy), either as an unusually seductive woman (high self-esteem) or as an unusually submissive woman (low self-esteem). Therefore, the satisfactory parental handling and resolution of the Electra complex are most important in developing the female infantile super-ego, because, by identifying with a parent, the girl internalizes morality; thereby, she chooses to comply with societal rules, rather than reflexively complying in fear of punishment.

In regard to narcissism
In regard to narcissism, the Oedipus complex is viewed as the pinnacle of the individual's maturational striving for success or for love. In The Economic Problem of Masochism (1924), Freud writes that in "the Oedipus complex... [the parent's] personal significance for the superego recedes into the background' and 'the imagos they leave behind... link [to] the influences of teachers and authorities...". Educators and mentors are put in the ego ideal of the individual and they strive to take on their knowledge, skills, or insights.

In Some Reflections on Schoolboy Psychology (1914), Freud writes:
"We can now understand our relation to our schoolmasters. These men, not all of whom were in fact fathers themselves, became our substitute fathers. That was why, even though they were still quite young, they struck us as so mature and so unattainably adult. We transferred on to them the respect and expectations attaching to the omniscient father of our childhood, and we then began to treat them as we treated our fathers at home. We confronted them with the ambivalence that we had acquired in our own families and with its help, we struggled with them as we had been in the habit of struggling with our fathers..."

The Oedipus complex, in narcissistic terms, represents that an individual can lose the ability to take a parental-substitute into his ego ideal without ambivalence. Once the individual has ambivalent relations with parental-substitutes, he will enter into the triangulating castration complex. In the castration complex the individual becomes rivalrous with parental-substitutes and this will be the point of regression. In Psycho-analytic notes on an autobiographical account of a case of paranoia (Dementia paranoides) (1911), Freud writes that "disappointment over a woman" (object drives) or "a mishap in social relations with other men" (ego drives) is the cause of regression or symptom formation. Triangulation can take place with a romantic rival, for a woman, or with a work rival, for the reputation of being more potent.

Freudian theoretic revision
When Freud proposed that the Oedipus complex was psychologically universal, he provoked the evolution of Freudian psychology and the psychoanalytic treatment method, by collaborators and competitors alike.

Carl Gustav Jung

In countering Freud's proposal that the psychosexual development of boys and girls is equal, i.e. equally oriented – that each initially experiences sexual desire (libido) for mother, and aggression towards father, student–collaborator Carl Jung counter-proposed that girls experienced desire for father and aggression towards mother via the Electra complex—derived from the 5th-century BC Greek mythologic character Electra, who plotted matricidal revenge with Orestes, her brother, against Clytemnestra, their mother, and Aegisthus, their stepfather, for their murder of Agamemnon, her father (cf. Electra, by Sophocles).
Moreover, because it is native to Freudian psychology, orthodox Jungian psychology uses the term "Oedipus complex" only to denote a boy's psychosexual development.

Otto Rank

In classical Freudian psychology the super-ego, "the heir to the Oedipus complex", is formed as the infant boy internalizes the familial rules of his father. In contrast, in the early 1920s, using the term "pre-Oedipal", Otto Rank proposed that a boy's powerful mother was the source of the super-ego, in the course of normal psychosexual development. Rank's theoretic conflict with Freud excluded him from the Freudian inner circle; nonetheless, he later developed the psychodynamic Object relations theory in 1925.

Melanie Klein
Whereas Freud proposed that father (the paternal phallus) was central to infantile and adult psychosexual development, Melanie Klein concentrated upon the early maternal relationship, proposing that Oedipal manifestations are perceptible in the first year of life, the oral stage. Her proposal was part of the "controversial discussions" (1942–44) at the British Psychoanalytical Association. The Kleinian psychologists proposed that "underlying the Oedipus complex, as Freud described it ... there is an earlier layer of more primitive relationships with the Oedipal couple". She assigned "dangerous destructive tendencies not just to the father but also to the mother in her discussion of the child's projective fantasies". Moreover, Klein's work lessened the central role of the Oedipus complex, with the concept of the depressive position.

Wilfred Bion

"For the post-Kleinian Bion, the myth of Oedipus concerns investigatory curiosity—the quest for knowledge—rather than sexual difference; the other main character in the Oedipal drama becomes Tiresias (the false hypothesis erected against anxiety about a new theory)". As a result, "Bion regarded the central crime of Oedipus as his insistence on knowing the truth at all costs".

Jacques Lacan
From the postmodern perspective, Jacques Lacan argued against removing the Oedipus complex from the center of psychosexual developmental experience. He considered "the Oedipus complex—in so far as we continue to recognize it as covering the whole field of our experience with its signification ... [that] superimposes the kingdom of culture" upon the person, marking his or her introduction to symbolic order.

Thus "a child learns what power independent of itself is as it goes through the Oedipus complex ... encountering the existence of a symbolic system independent of itself". Moreover, Lacan's proposal that "the ternary relation of the Oedipus complex" liberates the "prisoner of the dual relationship" of the son–mother relationship proved useful to later psychoanalysts; thus, for Bollas, the "achievement" of the Oedipus complex is that the "child comes to understand something about the oddity of possessing one's own mind ... discovers the multiplicity of points of view". Likewise, for Ronald Britton, "if the link between the parents perceived in love and hate can be tolerated in the child's mind ... this provides us with a capacity for seeing us in interaction with others, and ... for reflecting on ourselves, whilst being ourselves". As such, in The Dove that Returns, the Dove that Vanishes (2000), Michael Parsons proposed that such a perspective permits viewing "the Oedipus complex as a life-long developmental challenge ... [with] new kinds of Oedipal configurations that belong to later life".

In 1920, Sigmund Freud wrote that "with the progress of psychoanalytic studies the importance of the Oedipus complex has become, more and more, clearly evident; its recognition has become the shibboleth that distinguishes the adherents of psychoanalysis from its opponents"; thereby it remained a theoretic cornerstone of psychoanalysis until about 1930, when psychoanalysts began investigating the pre-Oedipal son–mother relationship within the theory of psychosexual development. Janet Malcolm reports that by the late 20th century, to the object relations psychology "avant-garde, the events of the Oedipal period are pallid and inconsequential, in comparison with the cliff-hanging psychodramas of infancy. ... For Kohut, as for Winnicott and Balint, the Oedipus complex is an irrelevance in the treatment of severe pathology". Nonetheless, ego psychology continued to maintain that "the Oedipal period—roughly three-and-a-half to six years—is like Lorenz standing in front of the chick, it is the most formative, significant, moulding experience of human life ... If you take a person's adult life—his love, his work, his hobbies, his ambitions—they all point back to the Oedipus complex".

Criticism

Lack of empirical basis 

There is very little scientific evidence in support of the Oedipus complex.

Studies of children's attitudes to parents at the supposedly oedipal stage do not demonstrate the shifts 
in positive feelings that are predicted by the theory. Stories from mythology and anthropology that Freud used to illustrate his theory may fascinate his readers, but they do not constitute empirical evidence for the theory. Case studies that Freud relied upon, such as the case of Little Hans, could not be verified through research or experimentation on a larger population. Adolf Grünbaum argues that the type of evidence Freud and his followers used, the clinical productions of patients during analytic treatment, by their nature cannot provide cogent observational support for Freud's core hypotheses.

Evolutionary psychologists Martin Daly and Margo Wilson, in their 1988 book Homicide, argue that the Oedipus complex theory yields few testable predictions. They find no evidence of the Oedipus complex in people. There is evidence of parent–child conflict but it is not for sexual possession of the opposite sex-parent.

According to psychiatrist Jeffrey Lieberman, Freud and his followers resisted subjecting his theories, including the Oedipus theory, to scientific testing and verification. Evidence-based investigations in disciplines like cognitive psychology appear to leave Freud's ideas unsupported or contradicted by evidence, so they are not used in evidenced-based treatments.

Freud's supposed cure of Sergei Pankejeff, an alleged triumph of the Oedipus complex theory, is regarded as fraudulent by the scientific community and by Pankejeff himself.

Cover for sexual abuse 

The Freudian Coverup is the claim that Freud intentionally ignored evidence that his patients were victims of childhood sexual abuse, misrepresenting abuse as incestuous desire. In the 1970s, social worker Florence Rush wrote that Freud's seduction theory, which came early in his career, correctly attributed his patients' memories of childhood trauma to the patient's family, often the father, implying that widespread sexual abuse of children by parents was common in his society. The discovery of this abuse made Freud uncomfortable, so he abandoned the theory. He invented the Oedipus complex to replace it, because the complex allowed him to attribute stories of childhood sexual abuse to the children themselves; Freud imagined that the stories were fantasies of hidden desires, rather than factual descriptions of trauma. Thus, Rush argues, Freud covered up illegal and immoral sexual abuse by undermining the perceptions of his patients, particularly his female patients.

A director of the Sigmund Freud Archives, Jeffrey Moussaieff Masson, adopted the view that Freud's work was a cover-up for abuse after reading Freud's unpublished letters. In his book The Assault on Truth, Masson argues that Freud misattributed accounts of sexual abuse to fabrications and fantasies of children because, for personal reasons, he was unable to accept that the accounts were real. Freud invented the Oedipus complex to explain away the sexual assault of children. Among his reasons to suppress the abuse was that Freud did not want to be confronted by the father of a patient who was accused of committing abuse. Late in his career Freud sought to suppress the work of a colleague, Sandor Ferenczi, because Ferenczi continued to believe that accounts of childhood sexual abuse were truthful.

Masson writes that, because the theory of the Oedipus complex became widely popular, psychoanalysts continue to do damage to their patients by doubting the reality of the patient's early memories of trauma.

Gender role assumptions 

Many scholars and psychologists observe that, because the theory of the Oedipus complex assigns distinct roles to a mother and father, it is a poor fit for families that do not use traditional gender roles.

As of November 2022 same-sex marriage is legal in 31 nations. Same-sex couples start families through adoption or surrogacy. The pillars of the family structure are diversifying to include parents who are single or of the same sex as their partner along with the traditional heterosexual, married parents. These new family structures pose new questions for the psychoanalytic theories such as the Oedipus complex that require the presence of the mother and the father in the successful development of a child.

Evidence suggests children who have been raised by parents of the same sex are not much different from children raised in a traditional family structure. The classic theory of the Oedipal drama has fallen out of favor in today's society, according to a study by Drescher, having been criticized for its "negative implications" towards same sex parents. Many psychoanalytic thinkers such as Chodorow and Corbett are working towards changing the Oedipus complex to eliminate "automatic associations among sex, gender, and the stereotypical psychological functions deriving from these categories" and make it applicable to today's modern society. From its Freudian conception, psychoanalysis and its theories have always relied on traditional gender roles to draw itself out.

In the 1950s, psychologists distinguished different roles in parenting for the mother and father. The role of primary caregiver is assigned to the mother. Motherly love was considered to be unconditional. While the father is assigned the role of secondary caregiver, fatherly love is conditional, responsive to the child's tangible achievements. The Oedipus complex is compromised in the context of modern family structures, as it requires the existence of the notions of masculinity and femininity. When there is no father present there is no reason for a boy to have castration anxiety and thus resolve the complex. Psychoanalysis presents non-heteronormative relationships a sort of perversion or fetish rather than a natural occurrence. To some psychologists, this emphasis on gender norms can be a distraction in treating homosexual patients.

The 1972 book Anti-Oedipus by Gilles Deleuze and Félix Guattari is "a critique of psychoanalytic normativity and Oedipus" according to Didier Eribon. Eribon criticizes the Oedipus complex described by Freud or Lacan as an "implausible ideological construct" which is an "inferiorization process of homosexuality". According to psychologist Geva Shenkman, "To examine the application of concepts such as Oedipus complex and primal scene to male same-sex families, we must first eliminate the automatic associations among sex, gender, and the stereotypical psychological functions based on these categories."

Postmodern psychoanalytic theories, which aim to reestablish psychoanalysis for modern times, suggest modifying or discarding the complex because it does not describe newer family structures. Shenkman suggests that a loose interpretation of the Oedipus complex in which the child seeks sexual satisfaction from any parent regardless of gender or sex, would be helpful: "From this perspective, any parental authority, or institution for that matter, may represent the taboo that gives rise to the complex". Psychoanalyst Melanie Klein proposed a theory which broke gender stereotypes but still kept traditional father-mother family structure. She assigned "dangerous destructive tendencies not just to the father but also to the mother in her discussion of the child's projective fantasies".

Stretched theory 

Anouchka Grose understands the Oedipus complex as "a way of explaining how human beings are socialised ... learning to deal with disappointment". Her summary of the complex is "You have to stop trying to be everything for your primary carer, and get on with being something for the rest of the world". This post-Lacanian interpretation of the complex diverges considerably from its description in 19th century. Eribon writes that it "stretches the Oedipus complex to a point where it almost doesn't look like Freud's any more".

Aversion to incest 

Parent-child and sibling-sibling incestuous unions are almost universally forbidden. An explanation for this incest taboo is that rather than instinctual sexual desire, there is instinctual sexual aversion against these unions (See Westermarck effect). Steven Pinker wrote that "The idea that boys want to sleep with their mothers strikes most men as the silliest thing they have ever heard. Obviously, it did not seem so to Freud, who wrote that as a boy he once had an erotic reaction to watching his mother dressing. Of note is that Amalia Nathansohn Freud was relatively young during Freud's childhood and thus of reproductive age, and Freud having a wet-nurse, may not have experienced the early intimacy that would have tipped off his perceptual system that Mrs. Freud was his mother."

Historical mystique 

In Esquisse pour une autoanalyse, Pierre Bourdieu argues that the success of the concept of Oedipus is inseparable from the prestige associated with ancient Greek culture and the relations of domination that are reinforced in the use of this myth. In other words, if Oedipus was Bantu or Baoulé, his story would probably not be viewed as a human universal. This remark recalls the historically and socially situated character of the founder of psychoanalysis.

Sexism 

Feminist views on the Oedipus complex include criticism of the phallocentrism of the theory by philosopher Luce Irigaray among others. Irigaray charges that Freud's work assumes a masculine perspective, epitomized by the centrality of the penis (or lack of a penis for girls) in the Oedipus complex. She thinks that Freud's desire for a neat, symmetrical theory leads him to a contrived understanding of women as inverse men. She charges that he does not explore mother–daughter relationships and that he dogmatically assumes female sexuality will be a perfect mirror of male sexuality.

Unpopularity 

In No More Silly Love Songs: A Realist's Guide to Romance (2010), Anouchka Grose says that "a large number of people, these days believe that Freud's Oedipus complex is defunct ... 'disproven', or simply found unnecessary, sometime in the last century".

Thomas Nagel wrote that psychoanalytic claims were not scientific, but a type of commonsense folk psychology. Adolf Grünbaum thinks this proposal is a failure because ordinary people typically find explanations based on forbidden unconscious motivations implausible.

Evidence 
A study conducted at Glasgow University potentially supports at least some aspects of the psychoanalytic conception of the Oedipus complex. The study demonstrated that men and women were twice as likely to choose a partner with the same eye color as the parent of the sex they are attracted to. Another study by anthropologist Allen W. Johnson and psychiatrist Douglas Price-Williams suggests that the classic version of the Oedipus Complex that boys go through is present, with the sexual and aggressive sentiments less repressed in cultures without class separation.

Another study examined adoptive-daughters and choice of husband. The study attempted to distinguish conceptually phenotypic matching from positive sexual imprinting. Phenotypic matching can be understood as an individual's seeking (presumably without conscious awareness) traits in mates that are similar to their own phenotype. Sexual imprinting can be understood as mate preferences that are influenced by experiences and observations with parents/caregivers in early childhood. Adoptive daughters were examined in part to disentangle these two influences. The results of the study support positive sexual imprinting independent of phenotypic matching: "Judges found significant resemblance on facial traits between daughter's husband and her adoptive father. Furthermore, this effect may be modified by the quality of the father–daughter relationship during childhood. Daughters who received more emotional support from their adoptive father were more likely to choose mates similar to the father than those whose father provided a less positive emotional atmosphere." The study's authors also hypothesized that "sexual imprinting on the observed features of the opposite-sex parent during a sensitive period in early childhood might be responsible for shaping people's later mate choice criteria," a hypothesis that would be at least partially in accordance with Freud's Oedipal model.

See also

References

Further reading
Britton, Ronald. "The missing link: parental sexuality in the Oedipus complex." In The gender conundrum, pp. 91–104. Routledge, 2003.
Britton, Ronald, Michael Feldman, and Edna O’Shaughnessy. "The Oedipus complex today." London: Karnac (1989).
Friedman, Richard C., and Jennifer I. Downey. "Biology and the oedipus complex." The Psychoanalytic Quarterly 64, no. 2 (1995): 234–264.
Green, André. The Tragic Effect: The Oedipus Complex in Tragedy. United Kingdom: Cambridge University Press, 2011.
Klein, Melanie. "The Oedipus complex in the light of early anxieties (1945)." In The Oedipus complex today, pp. 11–82. Routledge, 2018.
Loewald, Hans W. "The waning of the Oedipus complex." Journal of the American Psychoanalytic Association 27, no. 4 (1979): 751–775.
M. Fear, Rhona. The Oedipus Complex: Solutions Or Resolutions?. United Kingdom: Taylor & Francis, 2018.
Parsons, Anne. "Is the Oedipus complex universal." Psychological anthropology: A reader on self in culture 131 (2010).
Rudnytsky, Peter L.. Freud and Oedipus. United States: Columbia University Press, 1987.
Ullrich, Burkhard., Zepf, Siegfried., Seel, Dietmar., Zepf, Florian Daniel. Oedipus and the Oedipus Complex: A Revision. N.p.: Taylor & Francis, 2018.
Simon, Bennett. "“Incest—see under oedipus complex”: The history of an error in psychoanalysis." Journal of the American Psychoanalytic Association 40, no. 4 (1992): 955-988.
Smadja, Éric. The Oedipus Complex: Focus of the Psychoanalysis-Anthropology Debate. United Kingdom: Taylor & Francis, 2017.
The Oedipus Complex - A Selection of Classic Articles on Sigmund Freud's Psychoanalytical Theory. N.p.: Read Books, 2011.
Weissberg, Liliane (ed.), Psychoanalysis, Fatherhood, and the Modern Family. Switzerland: Springer International Publishing, 2021.
 Günter Rebing: "Aber so arbeitet nun einmal das Genie". Wie der Ödipuskomplex erfunden wurde. In: Sinn und Form 73 (2021), Heft 6, pp. 837–843

Complex (psychology)
Freudian psychology
Phrases and idioms derived from Greek mythology
Incest
Narcissism
Psychoanalytic terminology
1910s neologisms